German submarine U-216 was a Type VIID mine-laying U-boat of Nazi Germany's Kriegsmarine during World War II. Her keel was laid down 1 January 1941 by Germaniawerft in Kiel as yard number 648. She was launched on 23 October 1941 and commissioned on 15 December 1941 with Oberleutnant zur See Karl-Otto Schultz in command.

Design
As one of the six German Type VIID submarines, U-216 had a displacement of  when at the surface and  while submerged. She had two shafts and two  propellers.

U-216 was fitted with five  torpedo tubes (four fitted at the bow and one at the stern), twelve torpedoes, one  SK C/35 naval gun, 220 rounds, and an anti-aircraft gun, in addition to five mine tubes with fifteen SMA mines. The boat had a complement of between forty-four.

Service history

U-216 conducted only one patrol, sailing from Kiel on 29 August 1942. On 25 September, U-216 fired four torpedoes at the British Coast Lines Limited ship, Boston. On 20 October 1942, the U-boat was depth charged by a British Liberator aircraft and sunk south-west of Ireland in position  with all hands lost.

Wolfpacks
U-216 took part in six wolfpacks, namely:
 Lohs (13 – 15 September 1942) 
 Pfeil (15 – 22 September 1942) 
 Blitz (22 – 26 September 1942) 
 Luchs (27 – 29 September 1942) 
 Letzte Ritter (29 September - 1 October 1942) 
 Wotan (5 – 17 October 1942)

Summary of raiding history

References

Bibliography

External links

German Type VIID submarines
U-boats commissioned in 1941
U-boats sunk in 1942
World War II submarines of Germany
World War II shipwrecks in the Atlantic Ocean
1941 ships
U-boats sunk by depth charges
Ships built in Kiel
Ships lost with all hands
U-boats sunk by British aircraft
Maritime incidents in October 1942